Daraya (also spelled Daraiya or Darayya) is a town and municipality located in the Keserwan District of the  Keserwan-Jbeil Governorate of Lebanon. It has an average elevation of 690 meters above sea level and a total land area of 91 hectares. Daraya's inhabitants are Maronites.

References

Populated places in Keserwan District
Maronite Christian communities in Lebanon